Africa Eco Race is an annual rally raid, organised in France and run in North and West Africa, launched after the cancellation of 2008 Dakar Rally, and the subsequent moving of the rally to South America.

The rally claims to have innovated to give a special focus on security issues and sustainable development. In addition to the sporting aspect, the rally aims to put emphasis on individual awareness about eco-responsibility. Bivouacs are chosen far from cities and airport tarmac.

History

The Africa Eco Race Rally, intended for amateurs and professionals, lasts for more than 6500 km over 11 stages. The race crosses the territories of Morocco, Western Sahara , Mauritania and Senegal.

Editions
2009 - The 1st edition of the so-called Africa Race sailed from Marseille on December 26, 2008. The technical and administrative checks occurred on 26 and 27 December, the prologue took place on December 28, followed by embarkation and arrival in Nador, Morocco on 30 December.

2010 - The second edition of the Africa Eco Race started from Portimão, Portugal where administrative and technical verifications took place on 27 and 28 of December 2009, preceded by a shakedown, in which the contestants could show and test their vehicles.

2011 - The third edition took place from 27 December 2010 to 9 January 2011. The start was at Châteaux de Lastours and the arrival, as usual, was in Dakar, Senegal. This edition was the third victory in three editions for Jean-Louis Schlesser in cars, Willy Jobard with a hybrid ZONGSHEN in bikes and Czech Tomáš Tomeček in a Tatra truck.

2012 - The fourth edition made its departure on December 27, 2011 in Saint-Cyprien and arrived in Dakar on January 8, 2012. A fourth victory was claimed by Jean-Louis Schlesser in a buggy built by himself. The motorcycles title was won by Oscar Polli with a KTM and the trucks category was won by Tomáš Tomeček who got a second place in the overall ranking.

2013 - The fifth edition made its departure on December 28, 2012 in Saint-Cyprien and arrived on the shores of Lac Rose in Dakar on January 9, 2013. A fifth victory was taken by Jean-Louis Schlesser in a buggy built by himself. The motorcycles title was won by Martin Fontyn and the trucks category was won by Anton Shibalov with his Kamaz truck who finished second overall, ahead of Tomáš Tomeček and his Tatra truck.

2014 - The sixth edition made its departure December 29, 2013 in Saint-Cyprien and arrived on the shores of Lac Rose in Dakar on January 11, 2014 . A sixth consecutive victory was achieved by Jean-Louis Schlesser in a buggy built by himself, co-driven by Thierry Magnaldi. The motorcycle title was won by Michael Pisano with a Honda 450cc and Tomáš Tomeček took the trucks title with a Tatra.

2015 - The first edition without Jean-Louis Schlesser and with the return of the Kamaz official team, including an Hybrid truck. Jean Antoine Sabatier won the cars category with his Bugga One, the former Rally Dakar driver Pål Anders Ullevålseter won the bikes category while Anton Shibalov led his conventional Kamaz to the victory.

2016 - Departure from Monaco. Kanat Shagirov won the cars category with his Toyota Hilux Overdrive, while Pål Anders Ullevålseter and Anton Shibalov dominated completely motorcycles and truck categories.

2017 - Departure from Monaco. Russian Mini driver Vladimir Vasilyev won the cars' category, his fellow countryman Andrey Karginov captured the victory in the trucks' section, while 17-year-old Gev Sella from Israel claimed the bikes' title ahead of last year's winner Pål Anders Ullevålseter from Norway.

2018 - Departure from Monaco. French driver Mathieu Serradori and Fabian Lurquin won the car category for the first time as well, Paolo Ceci for Bike category and Gerard de Rooy, Darek Rodewald, Moi Torrellardona in truck category.

2021 - The race was cancelled due to health risks associated with the Covid-19 pandemic.

Environment and sustainable development
Both the participants and the organization make a commitment to take care not to leave harmful traces of their passage through countries. A series of projects will aim to use renewable resources to a long-term contribution to the lives of people in remote areas of several countries that the race will cross. These actions are tangible and lasting.

The organization is leading the way, giving all participants reusable flatware kits for any event. Some organization vehicles are equipped  with solar panels to use the energy stored during the day to carry out their missions.

The organization of the Africa Eco Race also created two projects for power generation using photovoltaic panels in Mauritania to power a school in Nouakchott and a library in Chinguetti.

For the environment, was created a category for experimental vehicles powered by renewable energy, designed to test at large scale and under extreme conditions, the reliability, power, strength and endurance of these vehicles.
In 2011 Africa Eco Race funded the planting of 3000 eucalyptus in Nouakchott, Mauritania.

However, the race organisation has refused to create any dialogue with the Polisario over rally access to Western Sahara.

Vehicles and categories

The three main categories are the Cars, Bikes and Trucks

Motorcycles: 450 cc class, up to 450 cc, Class Open (over 450 cc), +700 cm3 bicyl., EnduroCup, Female, Junior, Experimental (Hybrids, Eco), Classic and quad's

Cars and trucks: T1 (modified all-terrain vehicles), T2 (production all-terrain vehicles), T3 SSV, Open/Score, Classic, and T4 (Trucks)

"Experimental" group: vehicles powered by renewable energy created specifically for the rally, with its own ranking by kilometers

List of winners

Cars, bikes, trucks

SSV, Motul Xtreme Rider

Podiums

Cars

Bikes

Trucks

SSVs

Palmares and records

See also
 Rally Dakar
 Budapest-Bamako – Desert Rally
 Rallye des Pharaons

References

External links

 www.africarace.com (multilingual)

 
2009 establishments in France
Recurring sporting events established in 2009
Motorcycle races
Motorsport in Africa
Sports competitions in Dakar
Motorsport in France
Motorsport in Senegal